The 1960 United States presidential election in New Mexico took place on November 8, 1960. This was the first year where all 50 current states were part of the 1960 United States presidential election. State voters chose four electors to represent them in the Electoral College, who voted for president and vice president.

Background
In its early days New Mexico had been divided between largely Republican machine-run highland regions and its firmly Southern Democrat "Little Texas" region in its east. However, with a shift of these machine-run regions to the Democratic Party, the state became very largely a one-party Democratic state in the years following the New Deal, although Republicans – despite being severely faction-ridden – retained strength in many highland counties. Despite the GOP recapturing the governorship under Edwin L. Mechem in 1950 and retaining it for all but one term up to this point, the state's electorate was overwhelmingly aligned with the Democratic Party.

The nomination by the Democratic Party of a Roman Catholic in Massachusetts Senator John F. Kennedy introduced major complications into likely voting behaviour. In 1928, Al Smith had lost most of his party's traditional support in the Baptist "Little Texas" region due to his Catholic faith and Tammany Hall links. However, increasing Mexican-American voting and the power of older Hispanic Catholic voting meant that there was a potential counterweight to this trend, whose power was seen in a wave of anti-Catholic pamphlets in the southeast.

Vote
New Mexico was won by Kennedy by a narrow 1 point margin. His narrow win reflected a balancing of Catholic and anti-Catholic forces. In heavily Baptist Roosevelt County, Kennedy declined 15 percent from Adlai Stevenson II's share of the vote in 1956. In contrast, in traditionally Republican Socorro County – the solitary county won by Alf Landon in 1936 – Kennedy won 57 percent of the vote and became the first Democrat to win the county since 1932. Kennedy was also the first Democrat since 1936 to carry Mora County and the first since 1940 to win Santa Fe County. Both counties would become among the most Democratic in the state from the 1970s onwards. It is believed indeed that as many as 98 percent of Hispanic voters may have supported fellow Catholic Kennedy.

In his first bid for the presidency, Republican nominee incumbent Vice President Richard Nixon was defeated in an electorally sound nationwide Democratic victory. Nixon would later win New Mexico in both 1968 and 1972.

Results

Results by county

References

New Mexico
1960 New Mexico elections
1960